Alexander Curtis may refer to:

Alexander Curtis (British politician)
Alexander H. Curtis, American politician
Alexander Curtis (musician)

See also

Curtis Alexander (disambiguation)